Li Xuesong (born 21 December 1979) is a Chinese speed skater. She competed in two events at the 1998 Winter Olympics.

References

External links
 

1979 births
Living people
Chinese female speed skaters
Olympic speed skaters of China
Speed skaters at the 1998 Winter Olympics
Speed skaters from Changchun
Speed skaters at the 1999 Asian Winter Games
Medalists at the 1990 Asian Winter Games
Asian Games medalists in speed skating
Asian Games bronze medalists for China
20th-century Chinese women
21st-century Chinese women